is a rural district located in northeastern Yamanashi Prefecture, Japan.

As of July 2012, the district had an estimated population of 1,406 and a population density of 9.12 persons per km2. The total area was 154.2 km2.

The district formerly included the city of Ōtsuki and a portion of the city of Uenohara. It currently consists of the following two villages:
Kosuge
Tabayama

History

Kitatsuru District was founded during the early Meiji period establishment of the municipalities system on July 22, 1878 and initially consisted of 18 villages. Uenohara was elevated to town status on December 27, 1897, followed by Ōtsuki on April 1, 1933. Saruhashi became a town on April 1, 1935, followed by Shippo on April 1, 1954. However, on August 8, 1954, Shippo and Saruhashi merged with Ōtsuki to form the city of Ōtsuki. On February 13, 2005 the town of Uenohara merged with the village of Akiyama from Minamitsuru District to form the city of Uenohara.

Districts in Yamanashi Prefecture